The Adventist University of Lukanga is known officially in French as L'Université Adventiste de Lukanga and abbreviated as UNILUK is an institution of higher education in Butembo, Nord Kivu, the Democratic Republic of the Congo. UNILUK has approximately 700 students and offers undergraduate and/or master's degree in public health, nursing, education and psychology, theology and religion, agronomy, business administration,  humanities and modern languages and information technology.

UNILUK was established 1979 with reorganizations in 1995 and 1998.  It is operated by the North East Congo Union Mission of the Seventh-day Adventist Church, which falls under the East-Central Africa Division of the church. The school is part of the global network of post secondary education facilities run by the Seventh-day Adventist Church.

References

External links
 Official website

Universities in the Democratic Republic of the Congo
Universities and colleges affiliated with the Seventh-day Adventist Church